Hypercompe praeclara is a moth of the family Erebidae first described by Charles Oberthür in 1881. It is found in Colombia.

References

Hypercompe
Moths described in 1881